Muiredach mac Murchada (died 760) was a King of Leinster from the Uí Dúnlainge branch of the Laigin. He was the son of Murchad mac Brain Mut (died 727), a previous king. He ruled from 738 to 760.

The Laigin had suffered a crushing defeat at the Battle of Áth Senaig (Ballyshannon, County Kildare) in 738 at the hands of the High King Áed Allán mac Fergaile (died 743) of the Cenél nEógain. Muiredach maintained good relations the High King of Ireland, Domnall Midi (died 763) of the Clann Cholmáin.  Muiredach's son Bran Ardchenn mac Muiredaig (died 795) married Domnall Midi's daughter Eithne. In 759 Domnall led a host of the Laigin as far as Mag Muirtheimne, near Dundalk.

The Uí Máil branch of the Laigin had at times held the kingship of Leinster; the last being Cellach Cualann mac Gerthidi (died 715). In 744 the final attempt by the Uí Máil was defeated at the Battle of Ailén dá Berrach in Cualu, a district in County Wicklow. Two of Cellach's grandsons, Cathal and Ailill, were slain.

The Osraige king Amchaid mac Con Cherca also attacked Fotharta Fea (754), and the southern Laigin, the Uí Bairrche and Uí Cheinnselaig during Muiredach's reign.

Muiredach was ancestor of the Uí Muiredaig sept of the Uí Dunlainge with their royal seat at Maistiu (Mullaghmast) in south Kildare, in the territory known as Iarthair Liphi (western Liffey). His son Bran Ardchenn mac Muiredaig (died 795) was also king of Leinster.

Notes

References

 Annals of Ulster at CELT: Corpus of Electronic Texts at University College Cork
 Byrne, Francis John (2001), Irish Kings and High-Kings, Dublin: Four Courts Press, 
 Charles-Edwards, T. M. (2000), Early Christian Ireland, Cambridge: Cambridge University Press, 
 Hogan, SJ, Edmund (1910), Onomasticon Goedelicum: An Index to Irish Names of Places and Tribes  (locorum et tribuum Hiberniae et Scotiae), Documents of Ireland, University College Cork

External links
CELT: Corpus of Electronic Texts at University College Cork

Kings of Leinster
Kings of Uí Dúnlainge
760 deaths
8th-century Irish people
8th-century Irish monarchs
Year of birth unknown